Hellawes the sorceress is a character in Thomas Malory's 15th-century Arthurian legend compilation Le Morte d'Arthur. She is lady of the Castle Nygurmous ("of necromancy"), associated with the chapel perilous episode in one of the quests of Lancelot.

In Le Morte d'Arthur 
Hellawes is a treacherous enchantress whom Sir Lancelot encounters in his pursuit of a holy sword and special cloth to heal his wounded liegeman, Sir Meliot of Logres. Hellawes is the widow of Sir Gilbert the Bastard, recently slain by Meliot, and she had magically cursed Meliot so his wounds from the fight would not heal. In the story, she manages to lure the questing knight into her fearsome chapel perilous but Lancelot—who has been the object of her obsessive and unrequited love for seven years—successfully escapes with the items he needed to heal Meliot:

A similarly named but different character, also appearing in Malory's Le Morte d'Arthur, is Lady Annowre of Perilous Forest. Annowre is an evil sorceress who plotted to kill Arthur out of her love of him after being scorned.

Malory's sources 
The motif for her enchanted chapel (complete with the name, Chapelle Perilleuse) originates in Perlesvaus. The character of Hellawes appears to be connected to that of Lady Helaes of Perilous Forest (Helaes de la Forest Perilleuse), also known as Helaes the Beautiful, Gawain's one-night lover from the Lancelot-Grail (Vulgate Cycle), whose name seems to be also an echo of Héloïse.

In popular culture
 Hellawes and her chapel appear in the adventure video game Lancelot in a recreation of the scene from Le Morte d'Arthur. 
 A location named after Hellawes and her chapel appear in the role-playing video game Tales of Berseria. 
 She is mentioned as Annowre of the Perilous Forest in The Idylls of the Queen: A Tale of Queen Guenevere by Phyllis Ann Karr.
 She appears in the card video game Age of Ishtaria. 
 The story of Hellawes is invoked in the Dutch novel Jonkvrouw (published in Australia as "A sword in her hand" and in US/Canada as "With a Sword in my Hand") by Jean-Claude van Rijckeghem and Pat van Beirs.

References

Fictional characters introduced in the 15th century
Arthurian characters
Female literary villains
Fictional witches
Fiction about necrophilia